The maître d'hôtel, head waiter, host, waiter captain, or maître d manages the public part, or "front of the house", of a formal restaurant. The responsibilities of a maître d'hôtel generally include supervising the waiting staff, welcoming guests and assigning tables to them, taking reservations, and ensuring that guests are satisfied.

In large organizations, such as certain hotels, or cruise ships with multiple restaurants, the maître d'hôtel is often responsible for the overall dining experience, including room service and buffet services, while head waiters or supervisors are responsible for the specific restaurant or dining room they work in.

Food writer Leah Zeldes writes that the role of maître d’hôtel originated as a kind of combined "host, headwaiter and dining-room manager" and, in the past, persons with this role were sometimes responsible for such operations as tableside boning of fish and mixing of salads.

Traditionally, the host of a restaurant was a comparatively prestigious position given to trusted employees.  The maître d' represented the restaurant as a whole and coordinated its service.  While still true at certain high-end restaurants, this began to change in the 21st century.  Many restaurants kept a host position, but it became an entry-level position for new hires rather than a senior position.  According to the United States Bureau of Labor Statistics, most hosts in the US are young and made an average annual wage in 2020 of $24,800, a fairly low amount.  A potential factor contributing to the decline in the position is that customers are less deferential and ruder to hosts compared to the past, resulting in the position being seen as less desirable and less fulfilling.

See also 
 Beurre Maître d'Hôtel, a parsley butter
 Brigade de cuisine, a formal back-of-house (kitchen) hierarchy.
 Hospitality
 List of restaurant terminology
 Concierge
 Majordomo

References 

Restaurant staff
Restaurant terminology